Mary Louise Weller (born September 1, 1946) is an American actress.  She is perhaps best known for her role as Mandy Pepperidge in the popular 1978 film Animal House.  She has also guest-starred in such television series as Starsky & Hutch, Fantasy Island, B.J. and the Bear, Supertrain, and CHiPs, as well as appearing in Larry Cohen's film, Q.

Life and career
Mary Louise Weller was born in New York City and was raised in Los Angeles's Westwood area.  The famed entertainer Danny Kaye was her godfather. The onetime top New York model made her film debut with an uncredited role in the 1973 Al Pacino cop drama Serpico.  In 1978 Weller starred as a beautiful marine biologist in the made-for-TV film Hunters of the Reef (1978), and then as professor Andrew Prine's college student lover in the haunted house horror film The Evil (1978). She achieved perhaps her greatest enduring cult movie renown with her performance as prissy and uptight sorority sister Mandy Pepperidge in the 1978 hit comedy Animal House. After Animal House, Weller went on to appear in such films as The Bell Jar (1979), Once Upon a Spy (1980), Forced Vengeance (1982), Blood Tide (1982) and Q (1982).

Weller acted in several plays in New York and wrote the play Four Alone, which was performed at the Greenhouse Theater in Pasadena. She trained with the U.S. Equestrian Team as a teenager and has participated in horse-riding competitions. 

As of 2007, Weller is retired from acting.

According to Dancing at Ciro's, Mary Louise Weller is of Lithuanian Jewish descent.

Films

Television

References

External links
 
Profile, tv.com; accessed July 31, 2015.

Living people
Place of birth missing (living people)
American film actresses
American stage actresses
American people of Lithuanian-Jewish descent
American television actresses
Actresses from Los Angeles
Jewish American actresses
1946 births
21st-century American Jews
21st-century American women